Veerapandi is a legislative assembly constituency in Salem district in the Indian state of Tamil Nadu. Its State Assembly Constituency number is 91. It comprises a portion of Salem taluk and is a part of the wider Salem constituency for national elections to the Parliament of India. The constituency is in existence since 1957 election. It is one of the 234 State Legislative Assembly Constituencies in Tamil Nadu, in India. Elections and winners in the constituency are listed below.

Demographics

Madras State

Tamil Nadu

Election results

2021

2016

2011

2006

2001

1996

1991

1989

1984

1980

1977

1971

1967

1962

1957

References 

 

Assembly constituencies of Tamil Nadu
Salem district